Hui Cheong (born 20 October 1956) is a Hong Kong sprint canoer who competed from the mid-1970s to the mid-1980s. At the 1976 Summer Olympics in Montreal, he was eliminated in the repechages of both the K-2 500 m and the K-2 1000 m events.

External links
Sports-reference.com profile

1956 births
Canoeists at the 1976 Summer Olympics
Hong Kong male canoeists
Living people
Olympic canoeists of Hong Kong